James S. Cafiero (born September 21, 1928) is an American Republican Party politician, who served in the New Jersey General Assembly from 1968 to 1972 and in the New Jersey Senate from 1972 to 1982 and from 1990 to 2004, where he represented the 1st legislative district.

Early life and education
A graduate of the Lawrenceville School, Cafiero was awarded a B.A. in 1950 from Princeton University in Economics and a J.D. from the University of Pennsylvania Law School in 1953. Cafiero resides in North Wildwood. His father, Anthony J. Cafiero, served in the Senate from 1949 to 1953.

Political career
He served in the Senate on the Judiciary Committee and the Law and Public Safety and Veterans' Affairs Committee. Cafiero was Republican Whip from 2002 to 2004. Cafiero served as the Cape May County Assistant Prosecutor from 1958 to 1960. He is an attorney with the firm of Cafiero, Balliette and Balliette 

In 1996, Cafiero introduced a bill that would dedicate a portion of the special sales tax collected for the Wildwoods to be used for the construction of a minor league stadium that would have room for 5,000 fans.

References

External links
, New Jersey Legislature.

1928 births
Living people
Lawrenceville School alumni
Republican Party members of the New Jersey General Assembly
Republican Party New Jersey state senators
New Jersey lawyers
People from North Wildwood, New Jersey
Politicians from Cape May County, New Jersey
University of Pennsylvania Law School alumni
Princeton University alumni